Sanamahism (lit. "Sanamahi religion") or Meiteism (lit. "Meitei religion") or Lainingthouism (lit. "faith of God-king"), is an ethnic religion of the Meitei people of Manipur, Northeast India. It is a polytheistic religion and is named after God Lainingthou Sanamahi, one of the most important deities of the Meitei faith. Sanamahi is the eldest son of the supreme god Yaibirel Sidaba (also known as Saalailel Sidaba) and the supreme goddess Leimarel Sidabi. Traditionally every Meitei household, irrespective of the religion, worships Sanamahi and Leimarel Sidabi. The importance of Sanamahi in the religion is also emphasized in the name itself which means Liquid Gold. Sanamahism does not have a religious head but has a body, Maru Loishang (also known as Pandit Loishang) that oversees the main religious activities and govern all affairs pertaining to the religion including conducts of priest and priestess. The Maru Loishang also acts a court for religious disputes. There are three main departments under the Pandit Loishang, namely, the Amaiba Loishang, the Pena Asheiba Loishang and the Amaibi Loishang. These departments have existed since the reign of King Meidingu Hongnemyoi Khunjao Naothingkhong of Manipur in 662 AD.

The deities in Sanamhism can be classified into the main deities, ancestral deities called Apokpa, deities of Meitei clans (Yek Lai) or family (Saghei Lai) and regional deities called Lam Lai or Umang Lai. Worship of the Apokpa deities, the Yek Lais or the Saghei Lais are within a clan, families sharing the same surname. Regional deities are worshipped by the residents around the temple of the Umang Lais. The Umang Lais are often one of the main deities or an incarnation of the main deities. The worship of Umang Lais and the ritual that this entails, referred to as the Umang Lai Haraoba, is one of the main religious festivals in Sanamahism. There are similarities between the Umang Lais and the Nat deities of Myanmar.

All the deities are denoted by the universal term Lai which means god in Manipuri. When referring to a male deity, the terms Lainingthou, Ebhudhou or Epa are used while the terms, Lairembi, Ebhendhou or Ema are used to refer to a female deity. Lairembi is mostly used for the Umang Lais.

Origin
The first mentions are found in the Cheitharol Kumbaba, the Court Chronicles of the kings of Kangleipak (old name of Manipur), starting from the king Nongda Lairen Pakhangba, who ruled for more than a century, from 33 to 154 CE.

Description 
Sanamahism is an ethnoreligion or folk religion. Opponents and rebel groups have sought to revive Sanamahism and related practices to emphasize the Manipuri heritage, along with seeking a ban on Bengali script and replacing it with the old Meitei script which was forcefully banned during the reign of King Garibniwaz.

Revival 
The collective effort of the revival of Sanamahism is often referred to as the Sanamahi movement. The earliest accounts can be traced back to the formation of the Apokpa Marup by Naorem Phullo (Laininghal Naoria) in 1930 at Cachar (present day Assam, India). The movement spread to the Manipur Valley by 1934. Although the movement did not gain momentum due to the Japanese invasion in the Second world war, plans were initially made to intensify the movement under the leadership of Takhellambam Bokul (Sanamahi Bokul). Phullo died in 1941.

Three years after the death of Phullo in 1944, the movement finally started gaining momentum in Manipur. Resolutions were made to denounce Hinduism and to revive Sanamahism in Manipur. Mass campaign were held to popularize Sanamahi religion at various places in Manipur. On the 14th of May, 1945, the popular Meitei Marup was formed. This marked the beginning of the revival of Sanamahism and the Meitei Mayek, original script of the Manipuri Language among other things. The term Sanamahism and Meitei Marup are often used interchangeably. The Brahma Sabha strongly opposed the movement and formally outcast 38 members of the Meitei Marup.

By the 1970s and 1980s, the Sanamahi Movement attracted more number of activist. Massive drives were held reclaiming shrines of deiteis and adverting Hindu practices or worship to ancient old traditions of Sanamahism. Notable movement was the seize of the idols of Sanamahi and Leimarel Sidabi from Hindu Brahmins which are now presently installed in the temple at First Manipur Rifles Ground, Imphal. On the 16th of February, 1974, mass convert to Sanamahism was held. The event is coined, Nongkhang Parei Hanba, symbolic to reversing the forced mass baptism into Hinduism in 1729, referred to as Nongkhang Iruppa.

The 2011 census of India places the Sanamahi followers to be 8.19% of the total population of Manipur, India.

Official Status 
On 5 August 2022, the Manipur State Legislative Assembly re affirmed a resolution to record the Sanamahi religion in the census data with a separate unique code as an officially recognised minority religion of India. In the past, on 31 July 2002 and on 1 August 2003, the Manipur State Legislative Assembly had adopted similar resolutions to allot a unique code for the religion but didn't get approved by the Central Government of India.

In the previous decades, many social, religious and political activists, associations and organisations struggled through violent agitations and protests to include the Sanamahi religion as an officially recognised minority religion of India.

Practices 
Many Sanamahi practices are focused on food offerings to deities, combined with hymns, as well as oracular ritual in which priestesses become possessed by a god or goddess. An offering formula to call up the gods, uttered by a priestess over a body of water during the Lai Haraoba festival, goes:

Some esoteric practices are also a part of Sanamahism, such as the use of mantras for various purposes. The mystical text Sanamahi Naiyom provides several formulas, such as a mantra that is believed to stop rain.

Religious festivals

 Sanamahi Ahong Khong Chingba
 Lai Haraoba
 Mera Hou Chongba
 Mera Chaorel Houba
 Kwaak Taanba
 Yaoshang
 Panthoibi Iratpa
 Imoinu Iratpa
 Sajibu Cheiraoba
 Heikru Hidongba

Deities

Main deities 
There are five main deities in Sanamahism:
 Asheeba: Protector and guardian god of mankind. 
 Atingaa Koilou Sitapa: Creator of the Universe. 
 Apanba: Ruler of the universe and destroyer of evil.
 Leimarel Sidabi: Earth Goddess. 
 Imoinu Ahongbi: An incarnation of Leimarel, and a goddess of wealth and prosperity.

Related deities 
Besides the five main deities, there are innumerable gods and goddesses, playing significant roles in the ancient pantheon, as well as in mythology. Examples include Panthoibi, Lainingthou Nongpok Ningthou, Lainingthou Koubru, Ibudhou Marjing, Thongalel, Wangbren, Eputhou Thangjing, Kounu, Nongshaba, Nongthang Leima, and Irai Leima.

Umang Lai 

Besides, there are other deities associated with sacred groves called Umang Lai including the groves of Konthoujam Tampha Lairembi.

Ancestral deities 

There are also deities for each clan (Yek Salai) and family (Yumnak), called Apokpa.

See also 

 International Sanamahism Students' Association 
 Kangla
 Kangla Nongpok Thong
 Kangla Nongpok Torban
 Pakhangba Temple, Kangla
 Lai Haraoba
 Moirang Sai
 Festival of Moirang Shai
 Lainingthou Sanamahi Kiyong
 Nongmaiching Ching
 Lainingthou Sanamahi Temple Board
 Marjing
 Marjing Polo Statue
 Marjing Polo Complex
 Heingang Ching
 Lists of creatures in Meitei folklore
 Lists of deities in Sanamahism
 Meitei mythology
 Puya (Meitei texts)
 Sanamahi creation myth
 Umang Lai

References

Footnotes

Sources

External links 

 
Ancient culture
Animism
Asian ethnic religion
Asian folk culture
Folk religion
Indian religions
Meitei culture
Nature and religion
Panentheism
Pantheism
Polytheism
Religion in Assam
Religion in Manipur
Religion in Tripura
Religion in South Asia
Shamanism
Spiritualism